Pasadena is a census-designated place (CDP) in Anne Arundel County, Maryland, United States. The population was 24,287 at the 2010 census.

The areas of Lake Shore, Riviera Beach and Pasadena are collectively referred to as Pasadena by residents.  As all areas are governed by Anne Arundel County, there is no distinction in services such as fire, police, or public schools.  All three areas are encompassed by the 21122 zip code. The collective area population was at 56,441 at the 2010 census.

Geography
Pasadena is located at  (39.112809, −76.551871) in northern Anne Arundel County. It is bordered to the north by the city of Baltimore, to the east by the tidal Patapsco River and by Riviera Beach, to the southeast by Lake Shore, to the south by Severna Park, and to the west by Glen Burnie. The original community of Pasadena, shown on USGS topographic maps at the intersection of Pasadena Road and Governor Ritchie Highway (Maryland Route 2), is now assigned by the U.S. Census Bureau to the Severna Park census-designated place, south of the border for the Pasadena CDP, which itself is centered along Mountain Road (Maryland Route 177) and includes the neighborhoods of Ashburn and Green Haven, and extends north along the Marley Neck peninsula all the way to the Baltimore city line.

Demographics

As of the census of 2010, there were 24,287 people, 8,546 households, and 6,435 families residing in the CDP. The racial makeup of the CDP was 86.2% White, 6.9% African American, 0.3% Native American, 2.6% Asian, 0.1% Pacific Islander, 1.6% from other races, and 2.3% from two or more races. Hispanic or Latino people of any race were 4.3% of the population.

There were 8,546 households, out of which 33.6% had children under the age of 18 living with them, 58.6% were married couples living together, 11.3% had a female householder with no husband present, and 24.7% were non-families. 17.8% of all households were made up of individuals, and 4.2% had someone living alone who was 65 years of age or older. The average household size was 2.84 and the average family size was 3.21.

In the CDP, the population was spread out, with 24.1% under the age of 18, 7.4% from 18 to 24, 30.2% from 25 to 44, 28.4% from 45 to 64, and 8.5% who were 65 years of age or older. The median age was 36.7 years. For every 100 females, there were 98.2 males.

The median income for a household in the CDP was $88,035, and the median income for a family was $95,025. Males had a median income of $57,108 versus $49,347 for females. The per capita income for the CDP was $34,498. About 2.3% of families and 4.7% of the population were below the poverty line, including 6.1% of those under age 18 and 7.8% of those age 65 or over.

Notable people
 Brandi Burkhardt, television, film and Broadway actress, vocalist and beauty queen
 Ronnie Dove, pop  star during the 1960s, country singer in the 1970s
 Dan Duquette, former general manager of the Baltimore Orioles 
 Jim Fassel, former head coach of the NFL New York Giants
 Todd Heap, former tight end for the Baltimore Ravens
 John R. Leopold, former Anne Arundel County Executive
 Mike Newton, pro football player
 Nilah Magruder, award-winning illustrator

Schools and education

Public schools

 High schools
 Chesapeake Senior High School
 Northeast Senior High School 
 Middle schools
 Chesapeake Bay Middle School
 Northeast Middle School (formerly George Fox Middle School)
 Elementary schools
 Bodkin Elementary
 Fort Smallwood Elementary School
 High Point Elementary School
 Jacobsville Elementary School
 Lake Shore Elementary School
 Pasadena Elementary School
 Riviera Beach Elementary School
 Solley Elementary School
 Sunset Elementary School

Libraries
 Mountain Road Library
 Riviera Beach Library

Parks and recreation
 Anne Arundel County Park
 Beachwood Park
 Bodkin Park
 Downs Park
 Fort Smallwood Park
 Lake Waterford Park
 Tick Neck Park
 Weinburg Park

References

 
Census-designated places in Maryland
Census-designated places in Anne Arundel County, Maryland
Maryland populated places on the Chesapeake Bay